Ya Suy (born January 7, 1987) is a Vietnamese singer from Lâm Đồng. He won the fourth season of Vietnam Idol on February 1, 2013.

Vietnam Idol

Performances/results

References

External links
 Official site
 
 
 Ya Suy on Vietnam Idol

1987 births
Living people
Vietnam Idol
Idols (TV series) winners
21st-century Vietnamese male singers
Churu people